Hantepe is a village in the Yenişehir District of Diyarbakır Province in Turkey.

References

Villages in Yenişehir District, Diyarbakır